Biology – The natural science that studies life. Areas of focus include structure, function, growth, origin, evolution, distribution, and taxonomy.

History of biology

History of anatomy
History of biochemistry
History of biotechnology
History of ecology
History of genetics
History of evolutionary thought:
The eclipse of Darwinism – Catastrophism – Lamarckism – Orthogenesis – Mutationism – Structuralism – Vitalism
Modern (evolutionary) synthesis
History of molecular evolution
History of speciation
History of medicine
History of model organisms
History of molecular biology
Natural history
History of plant systematics

Overview
Biology
Science
Life
Properties: Adaptation – Energy processing – Growth – Order – Regulation – Reproduction – Response to environment
Biological organization: atom – molecule – cell – tissue – organ – organ system – organism – population – community – ecosystem – biosphere 
Approach: Reductionism – emergent property – mechanistic
Biology as a science: 
Natural science
Scientific method: observation – research question – hypothesis – testability – prediction – experiment – data – statistics
Scientific theory – scientific law
Research method
List of research methods in biology
Scientific literature
List of biology journals: peer review

Chemical basis
Outline of biochemistry
Atoms and molecules
matter – element – atom – proton – neutron – electron– Bohr model – isotope – chemical bond – ionic bond – ions – covalent bond – hydrogen bond – molecule
Water:
properties of water – solvent – cohesion – surface tension – Adhesion – pH
Organic compounds:
carbon – carbon-carbon bonds – hydrocarbon – monosaccharide – amino acids – nucleotide – functional group – monomer – adenosine triphosphate (ATP) –  lipids – oil – sugar – vitamins – neurotransmitter – wax
Macromolecules:
polysaccharide: cellulose – carbohydrate – chitin – glycogen – starch
proteins: primary structure – secondary structure – tertiary structure – conformation – native state – protein folding – enzyme – receptor – transmembrane receptor – ion channel – membrane transporter – collagen – pigments: chlorophyll – carotenoid – xanthophyll – melanin – prion
lipids: cell membrane – fats – phospholipids
nucleic acids: DNA – RNA

Cells
Outline of cell biology
Cell structure:
Cell coined by Robert Hooke
Techniques: cell culture – microscope – light microscope – electron microscopy – SEM – TEM
 Organelles: Cytoplasm – Vacuole – Peroxisome – Plastid
 Cell nucleus
 Nucleoplasm – Nucleolus – Chromatin – Chromosome
 Endomembrane system
 Nuclear envelope – Endoplasmic reticulum – Golgi apparatus – Vesicles – Lysosome
 Energy creators: Mitochondrion and Chloroplast
Biological membranes:
 Plasma membrane – Mitochondrial membrane – Chloroplast membrane
Other subcellular features: Cell wall – pseudopod – cytoskeleton – mitotic spindle – flagellum – cilium
 Cell transport: Diffusion – Osmosis – isotonic – active transport – phagocytosis
Cellular reproduction: cytokinesis – centromere – meiosis
Nuclear reproduction: mitosis – interphase – prophase – metaphase – anaphase – telophase
programmed cell death – apoptosis – cell senescence
Metabolism: 
enzyme - activation energy - proteolysis – cooperativity
Cellular respiration
 Glycolysis – Pyruvate dehydrogenase complex – Citric acid cycle – electron transport chain – fermentation
Photosynthesis
 light-dependent reactions – Calvin cycle
Cell cycle 
mitosis – chromosome – haploid – diploid – polyploidy – prophase – metaphase – anaphase – cytokinesis – meiosis

Genetics
Outline of Genetics
Inheritance
heredity – Mendelian inheritance – gene – locus – trait – allele – polymorphism – homozygote – heterozygote – hybrid – hybridization – dihybrid cross – Punnett square – inbreeding
genotype–phenotype distinction – genotype – phenotype – dominant gene – recessive gene
genetic interactions – Mendel's law of segregation – genetic mosaic – maternal effect – penetrance – complementation – suppression – epistasis – genetic linkage
Model organisms: Drosophila – Arabidopsis – Caenorhabditis elegans – mouse – Saccharomyces cerevisiae – Escherichia coli – Lambda phage – Xenopus – chicken – zebrafish – Ciona intestinalis – amphioxus
Techniques: genetic screen – linkage map – genetic map
DNA
Nucleic acid double helix
Nucleobase: adenine (A) – cytosine (C) – guanine (G) – thymine (T) – uracil (U)
DNA replication – mutation – mutation rate – proofreading – DNA mismatch repair – point mutation – crossover – recombination – plasmid – transposon
Gene expression
Central dogma of molecular biology: nucleosome – genetic code – codon – transcription factor – transcription – translation – RNA – histone – telomere
heterochromatin – promoter – RNA polymerase
Protein biosynthesis – ribosomes
Gene regulation
operon – activator – repressor – corepressor – enhancer – alternative splicing
Genomes
DNA sequencing – high throughput sequencing – bioinformatics
Proteome – proteomics – metabolome – metabolomics
DNA paternity testing 
Biotechnology (see also Outline of biochemical techniques and Molecular biology): 
DNA fingerprinting – genetic fingerprint – microsatellite – gene knockout – imprinting – RNA interference Genomics – computational biology – bioinformatics – gel electrophoresis – transformation – PCR – PCR mutagenesis – primer – chromosome walking – RFLP – restriction enzyme – sequencing – shotgun sequencing – cloning – culture – DNA microarray – electrophoresis – protein tag – affinity chromatography – x-ray diffraction – Proteomics – mass spectrometry
Genes, development, and evolution
Apoptosis
French flag model
Pattern formation
Evo-devo gene toolkit
Transcription factor

Evolution
Outline of evolution (see also evolutionary biology) 
Evolutionary processes
evolution 
microevolution: adaptation – selection – natural selection – directional selection – sexual selection – genetic drift – sexual reproduction – asexual reproduction – colony – allele frequency – neutral theory of molecular evolution – population genetics – Hardy–Weinberg principle
Speciation
Species
Phylogeny
Lineage (evolution) – evolutionary tree – cladistics – species – taxon – clade – monophyletic – polyphyly – paraphyly – heredity – phenotypic trait – nucleic acid sequence – synapomorphy – homology – molecular clock – outgroup (cladistics) – maximum parsimony (phylogenetics) – Computational phylogenetics    
Linnaean taxonomy: Carl Linnaeus – domain (biology) – kingdom (biology) – phylum – class (biology) – order (biology) – family (biology) – genus – species
Three-domain system: archaea – bacteria – eukaryote – protist – fungi – plant – animal 
Binomial nomenclature: scientific classification – Homo sapiens
History of life
Origin of life – hierarchy of life – Miller–Urey experiment
Macroevolution: adaptive radiation – convergent evolution – extinction – mass extinction – fossil – taphonomy – geologic time – plate tectonics – continental drift – vicariance – Gondwana – Pangaea – endosymbiosis

Diversity
Bacteria and Archaea
Protists
Plant diversity
 Green algae
 Chlorophyta
 Charophyta
 Bryophytes
 Marchantiophyta
 Anthocerotophyta
 Moss
 Pteridophytes
 Lycopodiophyta
 Polypodiophyta
 Seed plants
 Cycadophyta
 Ginkgophyta
 Pinophyta
 Gnetophyta
 Magnoliophyta
Fungi
Yeast – mold (fungus) – mushroom
Animal diversity
Invertebrates: 
sponge – cnidarian – coral – jellyfish – Hydra (genus) – sea anemone
flatworms – nematodes
arthropods: crustacean – chelicerata – myriapoda – arachnids – insects – annelids – molluscs
Vertebrates: 
fishes: – agnatha – chondrichthyes – osteichthyes
Tiktaalik
tetrapods
amphibians
reptiles
birds
flightless birds – Neognathae – dinosaurs
mammals
placental: primates
marsupial
monotreme
Viruses
DNA viruses – RNA viruses – retroviruses

Plant form and function

Plant body
Organ systems: root – shoot – stem – leaf – flower
Plant nutrition and transport
Vascular tissue – bark (botany) – Casparian strip – turgor pressure – xylem – phloem – transpiration – wood – trunk (botany)
Plant development
tropism – taxis
seed – cotyledon – meristem – apical meristem – vascular cambium – cork cambium
alternation of generations – gametophyte – antheridium – archegonium – sporophyte – spore – sporangium
Plant reproduction
angiosperms – flower – reproduction – sperm – pollination – self-pollination – cross-pollination – nectar – pollen 
Plant responses
Plant hormone – ripening – fruit – Ethylene as a plant hormone – toxin – pollinator – phototropism – skototropism – phototropin – phytochrome – auxin – photoperiodism – gravity

Animal form and function

General features: morphology (biology) – anatomy – physiology – biological tissues – organ (biology) – organ systems
Water and salt balance
Body fluids: osmotic pressure – ionic composition – volume
Diffusion – osmosis) – Tonicity – sodium – potassium – calcium – chloride
Excretion
Nutrition and digestion
Digestive system: stomach – intestine – liver – nutrition – primary nutritional groups metabolism – kidney – excretion
Breathing
Respiratory system: lungs 
Circulation
Circulatory system: heart – artery – vein – capillary – Blood – blood cell
Lymphatic system: lymph node
Muscle and movement
Skeletal system: bone – cartilage – joint – tendon
Muscular system:  muscle – actin – myosin – reflex
Nervous system
Neuron – dendrite – axon – nerve – electrochemical gradient – electrophysiology – action potential – signal transduction – synapse – receptor – 
Central nervous system: brain – spinal cord 
limbic system – memory – vestibular system
Peripheral nervous system 
Sensory nervous system: eye – vision – audition – proprioception – olfaction –
Integumentary system: skin cell
Hormonal control
Endocrine system: hormone
Animal reproduction
Reproductive system: testes – ovary – pregnancy
Fish#Reproductive system
Mammalian reproductive system
Human reproductive system
Mammalian penis
Os penis
Penile spines
Genitalia of bottlenose dolphins
Genitalia of marsupials
Equine reproductive system
Even-toed ungulate#Genitourinary system
Bull#Reproductive anatomy
Carnivora#Reproductive system
Fossa (animal)#External genitalia
Female genitalia of spotted hyenas
Cat anatomy#Genitalia
Genitalia of dogs
Canine penis
Bulbus glandis
Animal development
stem cell – blastula – gastrula – egg (biology) – fetus – placenta - gamete – spermatid – ovum – zygote – embryo – cellular differentiation – morphogenesis – homeobox
Immune system
antibody – host – vaccine – immune cell – AIDS – T cell – leucocyte
Animal behavior
Behavior: mating – animal communication – seek shelter – migration (ecology)
Fixed action pattern 
Altruism (biology)

Ecology
Outline of ecology
Ecosystems: 
Ecology –  Biodiversity – habitat – plankton – thermocline – saprobe 
Abiotic component: water – light – radiation – temperature – humidity – atmosphere – acidity 
Microbe – biomass  – organic matter – decomposer – decomposition – carbon – nutrient cycling – solar energy – topography – tilt – Windward and leeward – precipitation  Temperature – biome
Populations
Population ecology: organism – geographical area – sexual reproduction – population density – population growth – birth rate – death Rate – immigration rate – exponential growth – carrying capacity – logistic function – natural environment – competition (biology) – mating – biological dispersal – endemic (ecology) – growth curve (biology) – habitat – drinking water – resource – human population – technology – Green revolution
Communities
Community (ecology) – ecological niche – keystone species – mimicry – symbiosis – pollination – mutualism – commensalism – parasitism – predation – invasive species – environmental heterogeneity – edge effect
Consumer–resource interactions: food chain – food web – autotroph – heterotrophs – herbivore – carnivore – trophic level
Biosphere
lithosphere – atmosphere – hydrosphere
biogeochemical cycle: nitrogen cycle – carbon cycle – water cycle 
Climate change: Fossil fuel – coal – oil – natural gas – World energy consumption – Climate change feedback – Albedo – water vapor Carbon sink
Conservation
Biodiversity – habitats – Ecosystem services – biodiversity loss – extinction – Sustainability – Holocene extinction

Branches
 Anatomy – study of form in animals, plants and other organisms, or specifically in humans. Simply, the study of internal structure of living organisms.
 Comparative anatomy – the study of evolution of species through similarities and differences in their anatomy.
 Osteology – study of bones.
 Osteomyoarthrology – the study of the movement apparatus, including bones, joints, ligaments and muscles.
 Viscerology – the study of organs
 Neuroanatomy – the study of the nervous system.
 Histology – also known as microscopic anatomy or microanatomy, the branch of biology which studies the microscopic anatomy of biological tissues.
 Astrobiology – study of origin, early-evolution, distribution, and future of life in the universe. Also known as exobiology, and bioastronomy.
 Bioarchaeology – study of human remains from archaeological sites.
 Biochemistry – study of the chemical reactions required for life to exist and function, usually a focus on the cellular level.
 Biocultural anthropology – the study of the relations between human biology and culture.
 Biogeography – study of the distribution of species spatially and temporally.
 Biolinguistics – study of biology and the evolution of language.
 Biological economics – an interdisciplinary field in which the interaction of human biology and economics is studied.
 Biophysics – study of biological processes through the methods traditionally used in the physical sciences.
 Biomechanics – the study of the mechanics of living beings.
 Neurophysics – study of the development of the nervous system on a molecular level.
 Quantum biology – application of quantum mechanics and theoretical chemistry to biological objects and problems.
 Virophysics – study of mechanics and dynamics driving the interactions between virus and cells.
 Biotechnology – new and sometimes controversial branch of biology that studies the manipulation of living matter, including genetic modification and synthetic biology.
 Bioinformatics – use of information technology for the study, collection, and storage of genomic and other biological data.
 Bioengineering – study of biology through the means of engineering with an emphasis on applied knowledge and especially related to biotechnology.
 Synthetic biology – research integrating biology and engineering; construction of biological functions not found in nature.
 Botany – study of plants.
 Photobiology – scientific study of the interactions of light (technically, non-ionizing radiation) and living organisms. The field includes the study of photosynthesis, photomorphogenesis, visual processing, circadian rhythms, bioluminescence, and ultraviolet radiation effects.
 Phycology – scientific study of algae.
 Plant physiology – subdiscipline of botany concerned with the functioning, or physiology, of plants.
 Cell biology – study of the cell as a complete unit, and the molecular and chemical interactions that occur within a living cell.
 Histology – study of the anatomy of cells and tissues of plants and animals using microscopy.
 Chronobiology – field of biology that examines periodic (cyclic) phenomena in living organisms and their adaptation to solar- and lunar-related rhythms.
 Dendrochronology – study of tree rings, using them to date the exact year they were formed in order to analyze atmospheric conditions during different periods in natural history. 
 Developmental biology – study of the processes through which an organism forms, from zygote to full structure
 Embryology – study of the development of embryo (from fecundation to birth).
 Gerontology – study of aging processes.
 Ecology – study of the interactions of living organisms with one another and with the non-living elements of their environment.
 Epidemiology – major component of public health research, studying factors affecting the health of populations.
 Evolutionary biology – study of the origin and descent of species over time.
 Evolutionary developmental biology – field of biology that compares the developmental processes of different organisms to determine the ancestral relationship between them, and to discover how developmental processes evolved.
 Paleobiology – discipline which combines the methods and findings of the life sciences with the methods and findings of the earth science, paleontology.
 Paleoanthropology – the study of fossil evidence for human evolution, mainly using remains from extinct hominin and other primate species to determine the morphological and behavioral changes in the human lineage, as well as the environment in which human evolution occurred.
 Paleobotany – study of fossil plants.
 Paleontology – study of fossils and sometimes geographic evidence of prehistoric life.
 Paleopathology – the study of pathogenic conditions observable in bones or mummified soft tissue, and on nutritional disorders, variation in stature or morphology of bones over time, evidence of physical trauma, or evidence of occupationally derived biomechanic stress.
 Genetics – study of genes and heredity.
 Quantitative genetics – study of phenotypes that vary continuously (in characters such as height or mass)—as opposed to discretely identifiable phenotypes and gene-products (such as eye-colour, or the presence of a particular biochemical).
 Geobiology – study of the interactions between the physical Earth and the biosphere.
 Marine biology – study of ocean ecosystems, plants, animals, and other living beings.
 Microbiology – study of microscopic organisms (microorganisms) and their interactions with other living things.
 Bacteriology – study of bacteria
 Immunology – study of immune systems in all organisms.
 Mycology – study of fungi
 Parasitology – study of parasites and parasitism.
 Virology – study of viruses
 Molecular biology – study of biology and biological functions at the molecular level, with some cross over from biochemistry.
 Structural biology – a branch of molecular biology, biochemistry, and biophysics concerned with the molecular structure of biological macromolecules.
 Neuroscience – study of the nervous system, including anatomy, physiology and emergent proprieties.
 Behavioral neuroscience – study of physiological, genetic, and developmental mechanisms of behavior in humans and other animals.
 Cellular neuroscience – study of neurons at a cellular level.
 Cognitive neuroscience – study of biological substrates underlying cognition, with a focus on the neural substrates of mental processes.
 Computational neuroscience – study of the information processing functions of the nervous system, and the use of digital computers to study the nervous system.
 Developmental neuroscience – study of the cellular basis of brain development and addresses the underlying mechanisms.
 Molecular neuroscience – studies the biology of the nervous system with molecular biology, molecular genetics, protein chemistry and related methodologies.
 Neuroanatomy – study of the anatomy of nervous tissue and neural structures of the nervous system.
 Neuroendocrinology – studies the interaction between the nervous system and the endocrine system, that is how the brain regulates the hormonal activity in the body.
 Neuroethology – study of animal behavior and its underlying mechanistic control by the nervous system.
 Neuroimmunology – study of the nervous system, and immunology, the study of the immune system.
 Neuropharmacology – study of how drugs affect cellular function in the nervous system.
 Neurophysiology – study of the function (as opposed to structure) of the nervous system.
 Systems neuroscience – studies the function of neural circuits and systems. It is an umbrella term, encompassing a number of areas of study concerned with how nerve cells behave when connected together to form neural networks.
 Physiology – study of the internal workings of organisms.
 Endocrinology – study of the endocrine system.
 Oncology – study of cancer processes, including virus or mutation, oncogenesis, angiogenesis and tissues remoldings.
 Systems biology – computational modeling of biological systems.
 Theoretical Biology – the mathematical modeling of biological phenomena.
  – study of animals, including classification, physiology, development, and behavior. Subbranches include:
 Arthropodology – biological discipline concerned with the study of arthropods, a phylum of animals that include the insects, arachnids, crustaceans and others that are characterized by the possession of jointed limbs.
 Acarology – study of the taxon of arachnids that contains mites and ticks.
 Arachnology – scientific study of spiders and related animals such as scorpions, pseudoscorpions, harvestmen, collectively called arachnids.
 Entomology – study of insects.
 Coleopterology – study of beetles.
 Lepidopterology – study of a large order of insects that includes moths and butterflies (called lepidopterans).
 Myrmecology – scientific study of ants.
 Carcinology – study of crustaceans.
 Myriapodology – study of centipedes, millipedes, and other myriapods.
  – scientific study of animal behavior, usually with a focus on behavior under natural conditions.
 Helminthology – study of worms, especially parasitic worms.
 Herpetology – study of amphibians (including frogs, toads, salamanders, newts, and gymnophiona) and reptiles (including snakes, lizards, amphisbaenids, turtles, terrapins, tortoises, crocodilians, and the tuataras).
 Batrachology – subdiscipline of herpetology concerned with the study of amphibians alone.
 Ichthyology – study of fishes. This includes bony fishes (Osteichthyes), cartilaginous fishes (Chondrichthyes), and jawless fishes (Agnatha).
 Malacology – branch of invertebrate zoology which deals with the study of the Mollusca (mollusks or molluscs), the second-largest phylum of animals in terms of described species after the arthropods.
Teuthology – branch of Malacology which deals with the study of cephalopods.
 Mammalogy – study of mammals, a class of vertebrates with characteristics such as homeothermic metabolism, fur, four-chambered hearts, and complex nervous systems. Mammalogy has also been known as "mastology," "theriology," and "therology." There are about 4,200 different species of animals which are considered mammals.
 Cetology – branch of marine mammal science that studies the approximately eighty species of whales, dolphins, and porpoise in the scientific order Cetacea.
 Primatology – scientific study of primates
 Human biology – interdisciplinary field studying the range of humans and human populations via biology/life sciences, anthropology/social sciences, applied/medical sciences
 Biological anthropology – subfield of anthropology that studies the physical morphology, genetics and behavior of the human genus, other hominins and hominids across their evolutionary development
 Human behavioral ecology – the study of behavioral adaptations (foraging, reproduction, ontogeny) from the evolutionary and ecologic perspectives (see behavioral ecology). It focuses on human adaptive responses (physiological, developmental, genetic) to environmental stresses.
 Nematology – scientific discipline concerned with the study of nematodes, or roundworms.
 Ornithology – scientific study of birds.

Biologists 

 Lists of notable biologists
 List of notable biologists
 List of Nobel Prize winners in physiology or medicine
 Lists of biologists by author abbreviation
 List of authors of names published under the ICZN

 Lists of biologists by subject

 List of biochemists
 List of ecologists
 List of neuroscientists
 List of physiologists

See also

 Bibliography of biology
 Earliest known life forms
 Invasion biology terminology
 List of omics topics in biology

Related outlines
 Outline of life forms
 Outline of zoology
 Outline of engineering
 Outline of technology
 List of social sciences

Journals
 Biology journals

References

External links

OSU's Phylocode
The Tree of Life: A multi-authored, distributed Internet project containing information about phylogeny and biodiversity.
MIT video lecture series on biology
A wiki site for protocol sharing run from MIT.
Biology and Bioethics.
Biology online wiki dictionary.
Biology Video Sharing Community.
What is Biotechnology  : a voluntary program as Biotech for Beginners.

Biology
Biology